Marian McLoughlin is a British actress, known for her role as Marina Bonnaire in the BBC soap opera Doctors. She also played the role of Brenda Jacks in the BBC series Home Time in 2009 and Julia in Fast Freddie, The Widow and Me in 2011. In 2021, she appeared in the Channel 4 soap opera Hollyoaks as Sue Morgan.

Career
After training to be a French teacher, she graduated from Newman College, and later took a postgraduate diploma in Drama at Bristol Old Vic Theatre School. Theatre work includes: Henry V, After the Fall and Bartholomew Fair at the Royal National Theatre, Edmund at the Royal Court, and numerous rep companies. TV work includes: series regular in French Fields, Doctors, Home Time, Born to Run, Thin Ice, Castles; period drama Nicholas Nickleby; plus roles in The Impressions Show, EastEnders and The Bill, and many other productions.  In 1997, she starred in the BBC drama Born to Run. In 2017 she played Marie in The Girls at the Phoenix Theatre in the West End. In 2021, she was cast in the Channel 4 soap opera Hollyoaks as Sue Morgan and appeared from April. She departed from Hollyoaks in scenes broadcast in July of that year.

Filmography

 Ladies in Charge (1986) - Doris - “Zoe's Fever”
 Tumbledown (1988) - Mandy - TV Movie
 French Fields (1989,1991) - Sweet Stallholder/Quarrelling Wife - “Who's Been Eating My Portidge?” (1989), “Make for the Hills!” (1991)
 The Labours of Erica (1990) - Sabine - “Cider with Jean Pierre”
 South of the Border (1990) - Tina - Episode #2.3
 The Piglet Files (1990) - Mrs Whiteley - “A Room with a View”
 The Ruth Rendell Mysteries (1989-1990) - Grace - 5 episodes
 Screen Two (1990,’91,’95) - Sarah/Mrs Healy/Jackie - “He's Asking for Me” (1990), “The Grass Arena: (1991), “Nervous Energy”
 The Guilty (1992) - Maddy Doyle - TV Movie
 Kinsey (1992) - Judy Kinsey - 6 episodes
 EastEnders (1991-1993) - DCI Chapman - 7 episodes
 Casualty (1993) - Ann Weston - “No Place to Hide”
 Medics (1993) - Ann Cornforth - 2 episodes
 Cracker (1994) - Catherine Carter - “Men Should Weep: Part 1”
 Dangerfield (1995) - Moira Keen - “The Accidental Shooting”
 Pie in the Sky (1995) - Jean Barratt - “The One That Got Away”
 Castles (1995) - Rachel Castle - 24 episodes
 Coogan's Run (1995) - Mrs Fraser - “Natural Born Quizzers”
 Casualty (1996) - Maria Wingate - “Asking for Miracles”
 In Your Dreams (1996) - Doctor - TV Movie
 The Fragile Heart (1996) - Margaret Sedgley - 3 episodes
 Born to Run (1997) - Bronson Flitch - 6 episodes
 One Foot in the Grave (1997) - Betty - “Endgame”
 Wycliffe (1995, 1998) - Fiona Jay/Lynne Carney - “Lost Contact”, “Land's End”
 Verdict (1998) - Jane McHugh - “Neighbours from Hell”
 Grafters (1999) - Pippa - 8 episodes
 Peak Practice (2000) - Ann Garwood - “Skin Deep”
 Silent Witness (2001) - Mary Townsend - “Two Below Zero: Part 1 & 2”
 Midsomer Murders (2001) - Barbara Judd - “Dark Autumn”
 The Life and Adventures of Nicholas Nickleby (2001) - Madame Mantalini - TV Movie
 The Fabulous Bagel Boys (2001) - TV Movie
 Table 12 (2001) - Jan - “Side Order”
 Dalziel and Pascoe (2001) - ACC Belinda Kennedy - "Walls of Silence”
 Loving You (2003) - DS Vicky Griggs 
 20 Things To Do Before You're 30 (2003) - Mrs Lynch - Episode #1.4
 Down to Earth (2003) - Mrs Daly - “Honesty”
 William and Mary (2003) - Trish- 2 episodes
 Foyle's War (2004) - Postmistress - “They Fought in the Fields”
 Thin Ice (2006) - Barbara - 6 episodes
 Blue Murder (2006) - Jo Waverley - “Steady Eddie”
 Poppies (2006) - Bea Daly
 Party Animals (2007) - Barbara Foster - Episode #1.3
 New Tricks (2007) - Shirley White - “Casualty”
 Midsomer Murders (2007) - Gwen Morrison - “They Seek Him Here”
 The Omid Djalili Show (2007) - 2 episodes
 Lewis (2008) - Phoebe - “The Great and the Good”
 Holby Blue (2008) - Marilyn - Episode #2.11
 The Bill (1986-2009) - various characters - 10 episodes
 Home Time (2009) - Brenda Jacks - 6 episodes
 The Impressions Show with Culshaw and Stephenson (2010) - Delia
 Fast Freddie, The Widow and Me (2011) - Julia - TV Movie
 Doctors (2008-2012) - Marina Bonnaire/Sue Finglesham/Margaret Watson - 51 episodes
 Silent Witness (2012) - Deborah Harding - “Death Has No Dominion: Part 2”
 Spy (2012) - Mrs Godfrey - “Codename: Ball Busted”
 Jo (2013) - Mrs Beatrice - “Notre Dame”
 Holby City (2013) - Coroner Valerie - “Home”
 Truckers (2013) - Judy - Episode #1.4
 Boomers (2014) - Pauline - Episode #1.5
 SunTrap (2015) - Barbara - “Look Who's Talking”
 Vera (2020) - Tina Tripp - Episode: ”Blood Will Tell”
 Casualty (2020) - Lil Weakes - Episode #34.23
 Trying (2020) - TV series, 4 episodes
 Hollyoaks (2021) – Sue Morgan – regular

References

External links
 
 

Living people
Actresses from London
English soap opera actresses
Year of birth missing (living people)